Public holidays in Bhutan consist of both national holidays and local festivals or tshechus. While national holidays are observed throughout Bhutan, tsechus are only observed in their areas. Bhutan uses its own calendar, a variant of the lunisolar Tibetan calendar. Because it is a lunisolar calendar, dates of some national holidays and most tshechus change from year to year. For example, the new year, Losar, generally falls between February and March.

National holidays
Bhutan has sixteen public holidays. Bhutanese holidays are rooted in the Drukpa Lineage of Kagyu Buddhism, the House of Wangchuck and the Tibetan calendar. Even secular holidays, however, have a measure of religious overtone, as religious choreography and blessings mark these auspicious days.

Winter solstice
Nyinlong or Nyilong ("return of the sun"), the winter solstice celebration, is a public holiday falling on 2 January every year. Nyinlog is considered the most auspicious day of the year. It is celebrated like new year among some western Bhutan, though more so in the central and eastern regions, where the shortest day of the year is marked with archery and feasting. Farmers, on the other hand, may feel some chagrin as the solstice signals longer and longer work days ahead.

Traditional Day of Offering
The Traditional Day of Offering (Dzongkha: buelwa phuewi nyim) is a holiday usually falling in January or February, on the 1st day of the 12th month of the calendar. The main purpose behind this holiday is to give thanks to Zhabdrung Ngawang Namgyal, the founder of Bhutan. It also focuses on charity, particularly feeding others, and recreation. The day is celebrated with feasting and traditional sports, including archery, digor, and khuru (darts). This holiday may have originally begun as a Bhutanese new year celebration.

Losar
Losar (Dzongkha), the New Year, is celebrated between February and March, officially on the 1st month, 1st day of the calendar. Festivities last 15 days, ahead of which people spend much time preparing food and alcohol and cleaning their homes of old and unused objects. In Bhutan, different communities celebrate Losar at slightly different times and refer to the holiday by particular local names. The common Losar greeting is "tashi delek."

Birthday of King Jigme Khesar Namgyel Wangchuck
February 21–23 are holidays commemorating the birth anniversary of Jigme Khesar Namgyel Wangchuck the 5th and current Druk Gyalpo.

Zhabdrung Kuchoe
Shabdrung Kurchoe marks the passing of Zhabdrung Ngawang Namgyal in 1651 at Punakha Dzong. It generally falls in April or May (4th month, 10th day of the calendar). The holiday is a national day of mourning.

Birthday of King Jigme Dorji Wangchuck
May 2 is the birth anniversary of Jigme Dorji Wangchuck the 3rd Druk Gyalpo, who began Bhutan's first steps toward modernization (b. 1928, Thruepang Palace, Trongsa).

The day is also celebrated as Teacher’s day throughout the country. The day sees students coordinating various programs at schools and institution showing gratitude to their teachers. Students gift cards to Teachers, while some students substitute their teachers in class to give them a time-out. The day also constitute cultural programs showcasing various dance and song items focusing on teachers and their contributions. The day usually ends with a common meal for the entire school or institution.

Coronation of King Jigme Singye Wangchuck
June 2 is the coronation day of the Jigme Singye Wangchuck, the 4th Druk Gyalpo (1974). It also doubles as Social Forestry Day, where children plant trees.

Parinirvana of Buddha
June 15 is Parinirvana Day, a public holiday commemorating the nirvana of Gautama Buddha.

Birthday of Guru Rinpoche
July 10 marks the birth anniversary of Guru Rinpoche (also known as Padmasambhava), the saint credited with introducing Buddhism to Bhutan in the 8th century AD.

First Sermon of Buddha
August 3 marks the first sermon of Gautama Buddha at Sarnath.

Blessed Rainy Day
Blessed Rainy Day (Dzongkha: thruebab) generally falls in September, and is held on an auspicious day during monsoon season. The traditional holiday has not always been a public holiday, but was rather recently reinstated to official status. The event is marked by feasting, drinking alcohol, playing traditional sports, and purification through washing. In some parts of Pemagatshel, the traditional celebrations are more intense than those of even Losar.

Dashain
Dashain, the main Nepalese (and Hindu festival, falls on October 6. During this holiday, houses are cleaned and replastered, gifts are exchanged, and families gather. Dashain has been a  public holiday in Bhutan.

Coronation of King Jigme Khesar Namgyel Wangchuck
November 1 marks the coronation day of Jigme Khesar Namgyel Wangchuck, the 5th and current Druk Gyalpo (2008).

Birthday of King Jigme Singye Wangchuck
November 11 marks the birth anniversary of Jigme Singye Wangchuck, the 4th Druk Gyalpo (b. 1955, Dechencholing Palace, Thimphu). The holiday is also called Constitution Day; under this king and at his behest, the Constitution of Bhutan was enacted.

Lhabab Duchen
Lhabab Duchen is a public holiday generally falling in November (on the 9th month, 22nd day of the Tibetan calendar). Lhabab Duchen marks Gautama Buddha's return to earth after attaining Nirvana. In the eastern regions of Bhutan, the holiday is a popular occasion for performing Lhasoel, which are religious offerings in the form of ara (traditional wine), blessings, and supplications.

National Day
The National Day (Gyalyong Duechen) of Bhutan is December 17. The date marks the coronation of Ugyen Wangchuck as the first Druk Gyalpo of modern Bhutan. Celebrations are held at Changlimithang Stadium, and include a public address by the Druk Gyalpo and a procession including a statue of Ugyen Wangchuck to honor the first Druk Gyalpo and the independent Bhutanese nation.

Tsechus

Numerous tsechus, or festivals, take place for up to five days each at different locales across Bhutan. These usually feature large-scale pageantry and costumes, allegorical dances, archery, and music. These festivals are centuries-old traditions functioning not only as links to the past but also attract large numbers of tourists.

Below is a list of major tsechus in Bhutan, along with their 2011 dates. Dates in other years will vary.

See also
 Dashain
 Lhabab Duchen
 Losar
 Tsechu
 Culture of Bhutan

References

 
Bhutan